Dollars for a Fast Gun (also known as  and ) is a 1966 Italian-Spanish comedy western film directed by Joaquín Luis Romero Marchent with Mariano Canales as the assistant director, it was written by Sergio Donati, and scored by Marcello Giombini. It stars Robert Hundar, Pamela Tudor, Roberto Camardiel and José Bódalo.

This film supposed the breakup between Marchent and Grimaldi. The film was collaborated by Sergio Leone's mates. It did not receive good reviews.

Marchent western films such as Seven Hours of Gunfire (1965), Dollars for a Fast Gun and I Do Not Forgive... I Kill! (1968) are some of Quentin Tarantino's references.

Cast

References

External links
 

1960s Western (genre) comedy films
Spanish Western (genre) comedy films
Italian Western (genre) comedy films
Films directed by Joaquín Luis Romero Marchent
Films produced by Alberto Grimaldi
Films with screenplays by Sergio Donati
Films scored by Marcello Giombini
Films shot in Almería
Films shot in Madrid
Produzioni Europee Associati films
1966 comedy films
1966 films
1960s Italian films